Walnut Grove may refer to:

Canada
Walnut Grove, Langley, British Columbia

United States

Alabama to Georgia
Walnut Grove, Alabama
Walnut Grove, Arizona
Walnut Grove, Arkansas (disambiguation)
Walnut Grove, California
Walnut Grove Chinese-American Historic District, Walnut Grove, CA, listed on the NRHP in Sacramento County, California
Walnut Grove Commercial/Residential Historic District, Walnut Grove, CA, listed on the NRHP in Sacramento County, California
Walnut Grove Japanese-American Historic District, Walnut Grove, CA, listed on the NRHP
Walnut Grove (Waterford, Connecticut), listed on the NRHP
Walnut Grove, Georgia

Illinois
Walnut Grove, McDonough County, Illinois, an unincorporated community in McDonough County
Walnut Grove, Putnam County, Illinois, an unincorporated community in Putnam County
Altona, Illinois, a village in Knox County formerly known as Walnut Grove

Indiana to South Carolina
Walnut Grove, Hamilton County, Indiana 
Walnut Grove, Warren County, Indiana
Walnut Grove, Iowa, a community in Iowa
Walnut Grove, Kansas
Walnut Grove (Clarksville, Maryland), listed on the NRHP
Walnut Grove (Cheneyville, Louisiana), listed on the NRHP
Walnut Grove (Mer Rouge, Louisiana), listed on the NRHP
Walnut Grove, Minnesota (home of Laura Ingalls Wilder, author of Little House on the Prairie)
Walnut Grove, Mississippi
Walnut Grove, Missouri
Walnut Grove (Tar Heel, North Carolina), listed on the NRHP
Walnut Grove, Ohio
Walnut Grove, Pennsylvania, on Pennsylvania Route 849
Walnut Grove, South Carolina
Walnut Grove Plantation, Spartanburg, SC, listed on the NRHP

Tennessee
Walnut Grove, Hardin County, Tennessee, an unincorporated community
Walnut Grove, Sumner County, Tennessee, an unincorporated community
Walnut Grove (Gallatin, Tennessee), listed on the NRHP
Walnut Grove (Mount Pleasant, Tennessee), listed on the NRHP

Texas to West Virginia
Walnut Grove, Collin County, Texas
Walnut Grove, Smith County, Texas
Walnut Grove (Bristol, Virginia), listed on the NRHP
Walnut Grove (Spotsylvania County, Virginia), listed on the NRHP
Walnut Grove, Virginia, the location of NRHP-listed Cyrus McCormick Farm
Walnut Grove, Washington
Walnut Grove (Union, West Virginia), listed on the NRHP

See also
Walnut Grove Farm (disambiguation)
Walnut Grove School (disambiguation)
Walnut Grove School District (disambiguation)
Walnut Grove Township (disambiguation)